Clark Randolph "Randy" White is a former Democratic member of the West Virginia Senate, representing the 11th district from 2002 to 2011. Earlier he was a member of the West Virginia House of Delegates from 1996 through 2002. White lost the Democratic Primary to Gregory Tucker.

External links
Project Vote Smart - Senator Clark Randy White (WV) profile
Follow the Money - Randy White
2008 2006 2004 2002 Senate campaign contributions
2000  1998 House campaign contributions

West Virginia state senators
1955 births
Living people
Members of the West Virginia House of Delegates
21st-century American politicians